Michael Clifton Lorenzen (born January 4, 1992) is an American professional baseball pitcher and outfielder for the Detroit Tigers of Major League Baseball (MLB). He has previously played in MLB for the Cincinnati Reds and Los Angeles Angels.

In college baseball, Lorenzen was a pitcher and outfielder for the Cal State Fullerton Titans. The Reds selected Lorenzen in the first round of the 2013 MLB draft, and he made his MLB debut with the Reds in 2015. Lorenzen signed with the Los Angeles Angels for the 2022 season and with the Tigers before the 2023 season.

Education and amateur career
Lorenzen attended Fullerton Union High School in Fullerton, California, where he played for the school's baseball team. He had a batting average above .400 as a freshman. The Tampa Bay Rays selected Lorenzen in the seventh round of the 2010 Major League Baseball draft. Lorenzen opted not to sign, and instead enrolled at California State University, Fullerton, to play baseball for the Titans. In 2012, he was named an All-American and a finalist for the John Olerud Award. Lorenzen has also played on the United States national collegiate baseball team. In 2012, he played collegiate summer baseball with the Brewster Whitecaps of the Cape Cod Baseball League.

Professional career

Cincinnati Reds
Lorenzen was considered to be among the best prospects eligible for the 2013 Major League Baseball draft, and was ranked as the #52 prospect by Baseball America. He was selected with the 38th pick by the Cincinnati Reds. He signed and made his professional debut with the Arizona League Reds. He also pitched for the Dayton Dragons, Bakersfield Blaze, and the Pensacola Blue Wahoos during the season. In 21 innings pitched between the four clubs, he was 1–1 with a 3.00 earned run average (ERA).

The Reds invited Lorenzen to spring training as a non-roster invitee in 2014. He pitched for Pensacola in 2014, started 24 games, and pitched to a 4–6 win–loss record and a 3.13 ERA in  innings pitched. He tried out for the Reds in spring training in 2015 as a relief pitcher, but was reassigned to the minor leagues before the start of the season. He started the 2015 season with the Louisville Bats. The Reds promoted Lorenzen to the major leagues to start on April 29.

Lorenzen made his major league debut on April 29, 2015, pitching five innings against the Milwaukee Brewers. He gave up eight hits, including three home runs, walked one and struck out five, and was credited with the 8–3 loss. He stayed with Cincinnati before being optioned to Louisville on August 14. He was recalled by the Reds on August 31. In 27 games (21 starts) for the Reds, he was 4–9 with a 5.40 ERA, and in six starts for Louisville, he was 4–2 with a 1.88 ERA.

During spring training in 2016, he was diagnosed with a sprained ulnar collateral ligament in his right elbow, and he did not return until mid-June. He pitched out of the bullpen for Cincinnati upon his return, and he finished the year with a 2–1 record and a 2.88 ERA in 35 relief appearances. In 2017, he was 8–4 with a 4.45 ERA in 70 appearances in relief.

Lorenzen was called up to pinch-hit in the seventh inning of a June 30, 2018 game against the Milwaukee Brewers, and hit a grand slam off pitcher Jacob Barnes. It was Lorenzen's third home run of the 2018 season.

During the 2018–2019 offseason, Lorenzen worked extensively as an outfielder and stated he had eagerness and desire for the transition to a two-way player. On September 4, 2019, Lorenzen became the second player in baseball history to hit a home run, earn the win as the pitcher, and play in the field in the same game when the Reds defeated the Phillies, 8–5. The other player to achieve the feat was Babe Ruth on June 13, 1921. In 2020 for the Reds, Lorenzen pitched in 18 games, registering a 3–1 record and a 4.28 ERA with 35 strikeouts in  innings of work.

On April 14, 2021, Lorenzen was placed on the 60-day injured list with a shoulder strain. On July 17, Lorenzen was activated off of the injured list.

Los Angeles Angels
On November 30, 2021, Lorenzen signed a one-year contract with the Los Angeles Angels worth $6.75 million. Lorenzen sought to sign with a team that would allow him to start games and picked the Angels out of several offering teams because of his childhood in the Anaheim area. He made his Angels debut on April 11, 2022, starting the game and pitching 6 innings with 2 hits and 1 earned run allowed while striking out 7 against the Miami Marlins.
On May 1, 2022, Lorenzen made his longest career start against the Chicago White Sox, giving up 3 runs in  innings of work. On July 7, the Angels placed Lorenzen on the 15-day injured list due to a strain in his right shoulder. An MRI found that there was no structural damage from the injury. He was later transferred to the 60-day injured list. In 18 starts, Lorenzen finished the season with an 8–6 record, posting a 4.24 ERA with 85 strikeouts.

Detroit Tigers
On December 20, 2022, Lorenzen signed a one-year contract with the Detroit Tigers worth $8.5 million.

Personal life
Lorenzen is the youngest of four children, all boys, Jonathan, Matthew, and Anthony. Jonathan played professionally and Matthew played college baseball at Cypress and Fullerton Colleges.

Both of Lorenzen's parents struggled with drugs and alcohol and frequently fought, with Lorenzen stating that police would show up at his house "almost every single weekend." Lorenzen began experimenting with drugs and alcohol in eighth grade, but stopped when he was 17 after a man read him the Gospel. He is now a devout Christian. He has Galatians 2:20 tattooed on his left arm.

Lorenzen and his wife, Cassi, married in 2016.

See also

2013 College Baseball All-America Team

References

External links

1992 births
Living people
All-American college baseball players
Baseball players from Anaheim, California
Major League Baseball pitchers
Sportspeople from Fullerton, California
Cincinnati Reds players
Los Angeles Angels players
Cal State Fullerton Titans baseball players
Brewster Whitecaps players
Arizona League Reds players
Dayton Dragons players
Bakersfield Blaze players
Pensacola Blue Wahoos players
Glendale Desert Dogs players
Louisville Bats players